Weir is a town and a municipality in Bharatpur District in the Indian state of Rajasthan.

History 
Raja Pratap Singh of Weir, son of Brajraj Raja Shri Mahendra Badan Singh of Bharatpur was granted estate of Weir around 1739.

Geography
It has an average elevation of 272 metres (1092 feet).

Demographics
 Indian census, Weir had a population of 17,331. Males constituted 53% of the population and females 47%. Weir had an average literacy rate of 57%, lower than the national average of 59.5%. Male literacy was 71% and female literacy was 41%. In Weir, 18% of the population was under six years of age.

Tourist attractions
 Baba Manohar Das Temple
 Kila Weir
 White Palace
 NoLakha Bagh
 Sita Ka Kund
 Pili Pokhar (Lakhanpur)
 Sidh Ashram (Lakhanpur)
 The Dev Baba temple in Nagla Jahaz, Weir
 Flower park (world's oldest flower park)
 Fruit garden (sells guava, papaya, lemon, orange, aabla, ber etc.)
 Old Sitaramji Temple (near Pratap River)
 Baldau ji Temple (main market)
 Temple of Garhwale Hanuman ji (Dr.Rangheya Raghav Colony)
 Damodar ji Temple / Bhagwan Parshuram Mandir / Brahmin Samaj Dharmashala
 Baladuary Mandir (Nolakha Bag)
 Dr. Rangeya Raghava Colony
 Shri Balla Wale Hunumanji
 Nagaich Mandir
 Lakshkar ka ghar (bangle makers)

Colleges
 Chetram Ward College
 Ranghey Raghav Mahila Mahavidhalay, Bharatpur Gate, Weir
 Punjab Technical University
 Baba Manohar Das College, Halena Road
 M.G. College, Weir
 S.N. College, Weir
 Utkarsh College, Weir

Schools
 Adarsh Vidya Mandir, Weir
 Princess Public School, Bayana Gate
 Shanti Vidya Mandir
 Saraswati Senior Secondary School
 Modern Public Senior Secondary School
 Bal Vikas Vidhya Mandir
 Govt Senior Secondary School, Weir
 Govt Senior Secondary Girls School, Weir
 Govt Primary School, Foolwri, Weir
 Govt Primary School, Kila, Weir
 Govt Girls Primary School, Kila, Weir
 Gurukul Public School, Weir 
 Shri Ganesh Senior Secondary School, Weir
 Creative Public School
 Somendra Vidya Mandir
 Arise Public School, Bayana Gate

References

Cities and towns in Bharatpur district